Mr. Saturday Night is the fourth studio album by American neotraditional country artist Jon Pardi. The album was released on September 2, 2022, via Capitol Nashville. Pardi co-produced the album with Bart Butler and Ryan Gore, who he worked with on his previous release Heartache Medication in 2019.

Background
Mr. Saturday Night was announced in February 2022 alongside the release of its lead single "Last Night Lonely". When talking about the album with Billboard, Pardi said "These are songs that I've had on hold for two years, that have been part of this project for a long time. They stuck around and carved their names into this album and it wouldn't sound the same without them. Everything fits, from the ones I've written, the ones I've recorded, they're all based around me and in the long run, a lot of these songwriters know the sounds that I gravitate toward."

The album's official track listing was revealed on July 23, 2022, along with the release of "Mr. Saturday Night" as a promotional single. Of the album's title track, Pardi stated "I feel like everybody wants to be Mr. Saturday Night at one point on the weekend and have a good time. But then you hear the song and – the way it's so well written – it's a sad song, but you don't go there right away, because it's also a fun song. That's the thing about 'Mr. Saturday Night', it's more than meets the eye. It's all fun until you get to the chorus."

The album's second single, "Longneck Way To Go" was released to radio on July 18, 2022. A collaboration with Midland, who co-wrote the song with Rhett Akins and Ashley Gorley, the song was also featured on their album The Last Resort: Greeting From which was released on May 6, 2022.

A week before the album's release, Pardi stated in an interview that the deluxe version, planned for a 2023 release, would feature a collaboration with Luke Bryan. Of the song, Pardi explained "I'm pretty excited about it. It's a very country song. It's one of my favorites, and it was meant for me and Luke to sing. It's not about a girl, but it's about hard work. I think it's gonna be a big song."

In an interview with Taste Of Country, Pardi explained that his decision to only co-write five of the album's fourteen songs was due to his belief that the "best song wins", noting that "I could have wrote the whole record. Would it have been as good? No."

Track listing

Personnel
Adapted from liner notes.

Sarah Buxton – background vocals
Jess Carson – acoustic guitar (track 8), background vocals (track 8)
Dave Cohen – accordion, B-3 organ, piano, synthesizer, Wurlitzer
Robbie Crowell – B-3 organ (track 8)
Cameron Duddy – bass guitar (track 8), background vocals (track 8)
Justin Ebach – programming
Jeneé Fleenor – fiddle
Lee Francis – bass guitar
Paul Franklin – pedal steel guitar (track 8)
Ryan Gore – programming
Dann Huff – electric guitar (track 8)
David Huff – programming (track 8)
Mike Johnson – pedal steel guitar
Charlie Judge – piano (track 8)
Trey Keller – background vocals
Luke Laird – programming
Brice Long – background vocals
Brent Mason – electric guitar
Rob McNelley – electric guitar
Miles McPherson – drums, percussion, programming
Greg Morrow – drums (track 8), tambourine (track 8)
Justin Niebank – programming (track 8)
Jon Pardi – lead vocals, background vocals
Sol Philcox-Littlefield – electric guitar (track 8)
Danny Rader – acoustic guitar
Jeff Roach – B-3 organ, piano
Scotty Sanders – pedal steel guitar
Ilya Toshinsky – acoustic guitar (track 8), banjo (track 8)
Mark Wystrach – lead vocals (track 8)

Charts

References

2022 albums
Jon Pardi albums
Capitol Records albums